Kasper Lehikoinen (born 20 April 1992) is a Finnish badminton player. Trained at the BC Blue, he won bronze medals at the European Junior Badminton Championships in 2009 and 2011.

Achievements

European Junior Championships 
Boys' singles

BWF International Challenge/Series (5 titles, 4 runners-up) 
Men's singles

Men's doubles

  BWF International Challenge tournament
  BWF International Series tournament
  BWF Future Series tournament

References

External links 
 

1992 births
Living people
Finnish male badminton players
Badminton players at the 2010 Summer Youth Olympics
21st-century Finnish people